Ray Lalor (born 30 August 1936) is a former Australian rules footballer who played with Essendon in the Victorian Football League (VFL). He later played for Dandenong in the Victorian Football Association (VFA), then his old club's, Doutta Stars, and Benalla in country Victoria.

Lalor first played with Benalla in the Ovens & Murray Football League in 1951.

Notes

External links 		
		

Essendon Football Club past player profile

		
		

1936 births
Living people
Australian rules footballers from Victoria (Australia)
Essendon Football Club players
Doutta Stars Football Club players
Dandenong Football Club players
Benalla Football Club players